Chandiawala is a village in the Punjab of Pakistan. It is located at 30°58'0N 70°52'40E with an altitude of 138 metres (456 feet).

References

Villages in Layyah District